The AFL Under-19 Championships (for sponsorship reasons, the NAB AFL Under-19 Championships) is an annual Australian national underage representative championship in Australian rules football tournament. It is seen as one of the main pathways towards being drafted into a team in the fully professional Australian Football League (AFL).  

The National Championships grew out of the Teal Cup which began in 1953 as a junior representative competition between the Australian states of Queensland and New South Wales. It was rebranded in 1976 to reflect its expansion to include teams from each Australian state and mainland territory, rotated between host cities. In the absence of a national league, and less regular senior competition, it grew into one of the most important competitions in the country. Early on it was an Under-17 competition, however the age limit has been progressively increased and separate junior championships added for Under-15 level (commencing as the "Shell Cup" now AFL Under-16 National Championships) from the 1970s onwards. It was a major talent pathway for underage players outside of Victoria to the VFL. As part of the AFL Commission's role as national governing body the Victorian TAC Cup competition was restructured in 1992 to become the primary pathway to the AFL. As a result representative development sides from NSW/ACT and Tasmania for a time have played in that competition instead. However in recent years the National Championships has regained its status as a primary AFL recruitment pathway as the growth of the sport outside Victoria has accelerated.

The current competition is contested as a hybrid representative format. The best players from the Academy competitions (AFL club feeder teams) combine to form an 'Allies' team in conjunction with South Australia, Western Australia and two Victoria teams, Metro (Melbourne Metropolitan Area) and Country to contest the division 1 tournament.

History
Originally known as the Teal Cup, it began in 1953 as a junior representative competition between the Australian states of Queensland and New South Wales. The Australian Capital Territory was the first other side to enter in 1973. With the addition of teams from each Australian state and mainland territory in 1976 was rebranded as the "National Championships" and split into two divisions with the strongest states including Victoria (later split into two sides: Vic Metro and Vic Country) comprising Division 1. Papua New Guinea was the first other country to field a team in 1979. The division 2 competition was replaced by the Under-19 Academy Series in 2017, with teams from the 4 Queensland and NSW AFL clubs' academies in addition to Northern Territory and Tasmania state teams. The entire competition was changed to under-19s in 2021 (the competition has previously operated under-17s and under-18s competitions).

With the AFL Commission phasing out representative football at senior level since 1994, the National Championships are one of the few opportunities to play for their state or territory. Players typically share the senior team's guernsey (with the exception of Victorian teams which play in variations of the state team guernsey, Vic Metro has a light blue Big V insignia and Vic Country plays in a reverse white with navy Big V). 

The best players from the academy competition then combine to form an 'Allies' team in conjunction with South Australia, Western Australia and two  Victoria teams, Metro (Melbourne Metropolitan Area) and Country to contest the division 1 tournament. 

The winner of the 2019 division 1 tournament was Western Australia.

Winners and awards

Individual Awards
The Larke Medal is awarded to the best player in Division 1 of the competition. It is named in honour of a junior footballer, Michael Larke, who was killed in a bus crash while attending a trial match for New South Wales. The Hunter Harrison Medal is awarded to the best player in Division 2 and is named in honour of a former president and life member of the Northern Territory Football League, Hunter Harrison, who played a major role in the development of the AFL Youth Championships. Each tournament, an underage All-Australian team is named; an MVP is also named for each team.

Past winners

Participating teams

Current

Division 1
  Allies (Australian Capital Territory, Northern Territory, Queensland, Tasmania) (2016-)
  Victoria Country (Victoria) & Victoria Metro (Victoria)
  South Australia (South Australia)
  Western Australia (Western Australia)

Division 2
(Note: Since 2017, the AFL has replaced state and territory representative teams with an Academy division consisting of its QLD and NSW AFL Club sides: GWS Giants, Brisbane Lions, Gold Coast Suns and Sydney Swans)
 / New South Wales/Australian Capital Territory (New South Wales/Australian Capital Territory)
  Queensland (Queensland)
  Northern Territory (Northern Territory)
  Tasmania (Tasmania)

Past
  Australian Capital Territory (1973-199?) (later combined within NSW/ACT)
  Papua New Guinea (1979) 
  Victoria (1976-198?) (Split into two sides: Vic Metro & Vic Country)

Sponsors
The tournament is currently sponsored by the National Australia Bank, having previously been sponsored by Caltex and the Commonwealth Bank.

See also

AFL Women's Under 18 Championships

Notes

References

1953 establishments in Australia
Sports leagues established in 1953
Australian rules football competitions
Australian rules interstate football